Agapetus has been the papal name of two popes of the Roman Catholic Church. 

Pope Agapetus I (535–536)
Pope Agapetus II (946–955)

Agapetus